Tapiwa Nyasulu-Rweyemamu (born 15 August 1978), is a Malawian diplomat, Social Scientist, women-rights activist, anti-corruption activist and academic. Tapiwa currently leads Women and Gender Policy and Development at the African Union. Before joining the African Union, Tapiwa was Regional Advisor for Southern Africa at Transparency International where she managed and implemented the Africa Regional Anti-Corruption Programme.

Early life and education
Tapiwa was born in Karonga District in Northern part of Malawi to Malawian parents. She attended Chancellor College of the University of Malawi between 1998-2002 and holds a bachelor's degree in Arts Humanities. Between 2006 and 2007, she attended the Institute of Social Studies, The Hague, Netherlands where she obtained a master's degree in Development Studies specialized in politics of Alternative Development. Tapiwa holds a PhD in Social Anthropology from the University of Cologne, Germany through the Centre for Development Research of the University of Bonn. Her doctoral research sought to gauge the governance aspect (accountability and legitimacy) in customary land tenure in peri-urban Kasoa, Ghana.

Career
Tapiwa currently leads the Women and Gender Policy and Development Division of the African Union Commission in Addis Ababa, Ethiopia. She coordinates policy development on gender parity, gender equality and women and girl's empowerment of the African Union. She also leads the implementation of the African Women's Decade on Financial and Economic Inclusion of African Women 2020-2030 including the Women and Youth Financial and Economic Inclusion Initiative.

Before Joining the African Union, she was Regional Advisor- Southern Africa for Transparency International Secretariat, based in Berlin, Germany. For seven years, she managed and implemented the Africa Regional Anti-Corruption Programme in the region. She coordinated capacity development and advocacy interventions as well as ensuring the implementation of the accreditation policy. She was instrumental to the development of chapters and partners of Transparency International in South Africa, Malawi, Angola, Botswana and Namibia to name afew.

Tapiwa has also worked with the International Labour Organization in Geneva, Switzerland. Between 2011 and 2012, she supported the ILO/CRISIS Capacity Building and Knowledge Development and was involved in enhancing capacities of ILO staff and ILO constituents in implementing disasters and conflict response programme aiming at recovery and creating decent work in post crisis scenarios. Earlier in her career, she lectured at the University of Applied Management Accra, Ghana. Before that, upon graduation in 2002 she worked with the Deutsche Gesellschaft für Internationale Zusammenarbeit (GIZ) in a Malawi-Germany Programme for Democracy and Decentralization from 2003 to 2006 before joining the Danish Association for International Cooperation (MS-Zambia) in Zambia in 2006

Publications
 Nyasulu, Tapiwa Uchizi (2012). Governance and Customary Land Tenure in Peri-Urban Kasoa in Ghana. PhD thesis, Universität zu Köln.
 Ampadu, Richard Ameyaw and Tapiwa Uchizi Nyasulu. 2011. Customary Land Access and Accountability in Ghana: Effects of Land Allocation Practices on Local Livelihoods (2011)
 Nyasulu, Tapiwa Uchizi (2011) Watchdog NGOs in Malawi: The Case of Centre for Human Rights and Rehabilitation. Unveiling Challenges and Opportunities in Promoting Governance. LAP Lambert Academic Publishing, Germany

Personal life
Tapiwa is married to Dennis Rweyemamu, a Tanzanian and has a son named Jayden. She has two brothers Abwino and Anderson and a sister Ruth.

References

1978 births
Living people
Diplomats
Malawian diplomats
University of Malawi alumni